Neal Shaara, also known as Thunderbird, is a superhero appearing in American comic books published by Marvel Comics. The character was depicted briefly a member of the X-Men. Created by writer Chris Claremont and artist Leinil Francis Yu, he first appeared in X-Men (vol. 2) #100 (May 2000). He is the first Indian member of the X-Men.

An Indian pyrokinetic, he has no connection to the previous X-Men characters called Thunderbird. He is a vegan and was originally intended to be called Agni, after the Hindu god of fire.

Fictional character biography

Early life
Neal Shaara comes from an affluent family in Kolkata, where his father is the city's chief of police. His family also owned a large tea estate, where they all lived.

He was popular among girls because of his good looks. When his journalist brother Sanjit disappears, Neal decides to investigate, against his parents' wishes. Neal is shadowed by his father's best detective Karima Shapandar, and after Karima saves him from a group of thugs, the two began a romantic relationship while they search for Neal's missing brother.

Karima turned into a Prime Sentinel
They are ultimately captured by the villain Bastion, who plans to turn them into Prime Sentinels as he has done to Sanjit. However, the shock of the transformation causes his latent mutant powers to manifest, the power to generate and control solar plasma and heat.

Sanjit is able to disable the other Sentinels, but is severely wounded in the attempt. Karima, who is able to temporarily rebel against her programming, tells Neal to leave her, as her own transformation process commences, which will result in her killing him when the transformation is complete.

Joining The X-Men
Neal was now lost, alone and with strange powers that he neither comprehends nor wants. Neal goes to see family friend Moira MacTaggert on Muir Island, and he meets the X-Men, although he does not know this when he first meets them. Later, the X-Men revealed themselves, when they used their powers to stop Cable when his techno-organic virus runs out of control. Neal is initially frightened, but is eventually convinced to join the team. He chooses the codename Thunderbird, becoming the third bearer of that name so after the Proudstar brothers. He later adopted a more armored yellow and red uniform with wire mesh padding.

Psylocke
While with the X-Men, Thunderbird struggles with his fear of killing or hurting someone with his plasma. In addition, he also falls in love with the X-Man Psylocke, even though she is in a relationship with Archangel. Thunderbird and Psylocke often engage in flirtatious behavior in front of Archangel, who makes his displeasure felt to Thunderbird. The couple eventually breaks up, and Psylocke pursues a romantic relationship with Thunderbird.

Thunderbird becomes friends with Colossus, who like him, has also lost his brother. He also introduces him to the game of cricket. During one of their conversations, he says that though he is happy with Psylocke, he still retains his feelings for Karima, who is a Prime Sentinel.

Thunderbird's lack of control over his powers often caused problems during combat. He refrains from using them on his opponents due to the fear of killing them. Archangel mocks him and questions his place in the X-Men.

X-Treme X-Men
A short while, Thunderbird and five other X-Men formed a splinter group of X-Men dubbed the X-Treme X-Men, cutting all ties with the rest of the team while searching for Destiny's Diaries. He trains with Psylocke to gain better control of his powers, and learns to use only a small amount of plasma to blind or singe his opponents. Psylocke dies at the hands of Vargas, leaving behind a grief-stricken Thunderbird.

For a time he is seen working with the X-Man from the future, Lucas Bishop, another mutant with energy-related powers, in an attempt to overcome his fears and gain greater control over his powers. He comes to think of Bishop as his mentor. After Psylocke's death, he begins questioning the purpose of his life. Bishop tells him that while none of the X-Men are mentioned in the history books of his time, Neal is, a revelation that greatly motivates Neal.

During this time, he also visited the ruins of the island of Genosha, destroyed in a surprise Sentinel attack.

Relationship with Lifeguard
Some time after, Neal started a relationship with Heather Cameron, who was also known as Lifeguard. She and her brother Davis (who would become Slipstream) joined the offshoot group of the X-Men. After the inter-dimensional Invasion at Madripoor by the villain Khan, Thunderbird and Lifeguard left to search for her brother Slipstream, who left the team.

X-Corporation
Neal and Heather would later be seen as a member of the X-Corporation in Singapore, although Slipstream was nowhere to be seen. However this was short-lived as there was a synchronized attack on several of the X-Corporation offices after the catastrophic events of M-Day, leading Cyclops to call for the disbanding of all offices. Whether they aborted their search for Slipstream, or did find him, is not yet known.

Current status
In the "Decimation" storyline, it is seen in the 198 files, that he is one of the few mutants to retain their powers after the events of M-Day.. During the X-Men battle versus X-Man, aka Nate Grey, Jean Grey called help of all current and former X-Men to assist in the fight. Neal Shaara was one of those who joined the final fight. Though most of those who were at the end fight appeared in the Age of X-Man crossover, Neal was not seen.

He later appears in the Reign of X phase of the X-Men reboot, being interviewed by Monet and Angel for a seat in the X-Corp directors' board.

Powers and abilities
Thunderbird has the ability to transform the molecules of his body into solar plasma, enabling him to convert portions of himself into thermodynamic energy furnaces that release luminescent radiance, pyrotechnic displays, concentrated plasma beams, shaped plasma charges that can deflect solid matter or displace volumes of air on impact for a heatless release of concussive force, and explosive thrust from his legs for flight or projection of focused blasts, flashes, or explosive spheres. Because plasma is a superheated, ionized state of matter, it can melt or destroy most objects, with the exception of adamantium. Thunderbird can also use his power to generate sufficient propulsive thrust to fly at supersonic speeds. In his initial appearances, Thunderbird is relatively unskilled in the use of his powers, but receives further training from Psylocke and Bishop.

During his time being mentored by Bishop, he achieves greater control over his powers, learning how to use his blasts to only single targets. He can also use only a small amount to create a blinding flash.

References

External links

 
 UncannyXmen.net Spotlight on Thunderbird III

Marvel Comics male superheroes
Comics characters introduced in 2000
Characters created by Chris Claremont
Fictional characters with fire or heat abilities
Marvel Comics characters who can move at superhuman speeds
Indian superheroes
Marvel Comics mutants